Jamal Uddin Ahmed (12 June 1954 – 27 January 2021) was an Indian politician and former Member of the Assam Legislative Assembly.

Early life
Ahmed was born on 12 June 1954, to Bengali Muslim parents Haji Najib Ali and Sayful Bibi in Assam's Karimganj, which was a part of Sylhet district before the 1947 Partition of India.

Career
After passing his High School Leaving Certificate, Ahmed began social work. He became the president of a cultural club, and made a visit to Bangladesh.

Ahmed was successful in the 2001 Assam Legislative Assembly elections in which he represented the All India Trinamool Congress in the Badarpur constituency. He lost this seat to Anwarul Haq of the All India United Democratic Front in 2006.

In 2011, Ahmed won the elections as an Indian National Congress candidate and served two more times as MLA for Badarpur.

.

Personal life
Ahmed married twice, and one of his spouses was Rahima Begum. He had two sons and two daughters, including Zakariyya Ahmed.

Death
Whilst being transferred from Karimganj Civic Hospital to Silchar Medical Hospital, Ahmed died on 27 January 2021 during his third tenure as MLA. After his death no by-election was held in the constituency.

References

2021 deaths
Members of the Assam Legislative Assembly
1954 births
People from Karimganj district
21st-century Bengalis
Trinamool Congress politicians
Indian National Congress politicians from Assam